The Gendarmerie Special Operations or JÖH, is the special operations unit of the Turkish Gendarmerie General Command. Its tasks include search and destroy, infiltration, and reconnaissance.  Members of the unit receive extensive training at the Jandarma School at Foça and also from selected Turkish Armed Forces instructors.  All three of its companies work under the direction of the army regions to which they are assigned, but can also receive tasking from their headquarters in Ankara. It was established in 1991, at the height of the Turkish-Kurdish conflict. It has recently been involved in the Turkish occupation of northern Syria.
Unit members are in the 16-week training rooms at the Gendarmerie Commando Terrorist Operations School Command in Foça. All kinds of light weapons, mortar use, rocket launcher training, maneuvering training under fire, destroying target, target mountaineering, using GPS, finding directions over long distances, camouflage, being able to withstand fatigue and insomnia, making the right decision under stress, adapts to different climate and land needs, fight against terrorism in a residential area, explosive recognition, destruction, helicopter evacuation, contact helicopter and helicopter steering, transition through the water. Trainees are expected to complete a 10-kilometer rifle run, a 15-kilometer country run, and a 20-kilometer strength run. Basic movements such as shuttle, shuttle and push-ups are made in War Physical Education classes. Commando candidates run a total of 300 kilometers in running conditions. In addition, a 12-person sniper course is also provided. He also receives Gendarmerie Commando Specialization training.

Units

References

Special forces of Turkey
Gendarmerie (Turkey)